The vertical muscle of the tongue is an intrinsic muscle of the tongue. Its fibers extend from the upper to the under surface of the tongue. It is innervated by the hypoglossal nerve (cranial nerve XII). Its contraction flattens, widens and elongates the tongue.

Anatomy 
The vertical muscle of the tongue is an intrinsic muscle of the tongue. It is found only at the borders of the forepart of the tongue.

Structure 
Fibres of the vertical muscle of the tongue are arranged in an almost vertical direction, and intersect the transversely oriented fibres of the transverse muscle of tongue. Fibers of the vertical muscle of the tongue extend from the upper to the under surface of the tongue.

Innervation 
The vertical of the tongue is innervated by the hypoglossal nerve (CN XII).

Function 
Contraction of the vertical muscle of the tongue flattens, widens and elongates the tongue.

References 

Muscles of the head and neck
Tongue